5677 Aberdonia, provisional designation , is a stony Koronis asteroid from the outer region of the asteroid belt, approximately 8 kilometers in diameter. It was discovered on 21 September 1987, by American astronomer Edward Bowell at Lowell's Anderson Mesa Station in Flagstaff, Arizona, United States. The asteroid was named for the Scottish University of Aberdeen.

Orbit and classification 

The S-type asteroid is a member of the Koronis family, a group consisting of about 200 known bodies with nearly ecliptical orbits. It orbits the Sun in the outer main-belt at a distance of 2.7–3.0 AU once every 4 years and 9 months (1,743 days). Its orbit has an eccentricity of 0.06 and an inclination of 2° with respect to the ecliptic.

In 1954, a first precovery was obtained at Palomar Observatory, extending the body's observation arc by 33 years prior to its official discovery at Anderson Mesa.

Physical characteristics

Lightcurves 

In October 2011, a rotational lightcurve of Aberdonia was obtained from photometric observations at the Palomar Transient Factory in California. Lightcurve analysis gave a rotation period of  hours with a brightness amplitude of 0.20 magnitude.

Diameter and albedo 

According to the NEOWISE mission of NASA's space-based Wide-field Infrared Survey Explorer, Aberdonia measures 8.8 kilometers in diameter and its surface has an albedo of 0.25, while the Collaborative Asteroid Lightcurve Link assumes an albedo of 0.24 and calculates a diameter of 8.2 kilometers with an absolute magnitude of 12.6.

Naming 

This minor planet was named for the Scottish University of Aberdeen on its 500th anniversary in 1995. James Clerk Maxwell and George Paget Thomson are the university's best known former holders of chairs of natural philosophy.

The university is also known for its first chair of medicine in the English-speaking world, and for having taught astronomy already in the late 16th century. The approved naming citation was published by the Minor Planet Center on 15 February 1995 .

References

External links 
 Asteroid Lightcurve Database (LCDB), query form (info )
 Dictionary of Minor Planet Names, Google books
 Asteroids and comets rotation curves, CdR – Observatoire de Genève, Raoul Behrend
 Discovery Circumstances: Numbered Minor Planets (5001)-(10000) – Minor Planet Center
 
 

005677
Discoveries by Edward L. G. Bowell
Named minor planets
19870921